The Kawei K1 is a midsize pickup manufactured by Chinese automotive brand Kawei Auto, a brand of the Jiangsu Kawei Automotive Industrial Group Co., Ltd. The Jiangsu Kawei Automotive Industry Group is an automotive manufacturing company based in Danyang in Jiangsu Province.

Overview

The Kawei Auto K1 pickup truck debuted during the 2014 Beijing Auto Show.

Depending on the trim level, the Kawei K1 was also known as the Kawei K150 and Kawei K150GT. The Kawei K1 has a price range of 75,800 yuan to 98,800 yuan, the Kawei K150 has a price range of 93,800 yuan to 129,800 yuan, and the Kawei K150GT has a price range of 97,800 yuan to 132,800 yuan.

Controversy
Since its production, controversy has arisen due to the design of the Kawei K1 bearing a likeness to the twelfth generation Ford F-150, making it an unlicensed clone.

Kawei EV7
In 2017, Kawei unveiled the Kawei EV7, based on the K1, claiming it to be the world first pure electric full-size pickup truck.

References

External links
 

Pickup trucks
Rear-wheel-drive vehicles
Trucks of China
2010s cars